Tummwah is a village in the Giza Governorate in Egypt. Also Spelled as "Tamwah" and it is a coptic old name that the village is keeping from the Old Egyptian name.

According to the 2006 census, the village had 21,689 residents, 11,212 males and 10,477 females.

Populated places in Giza Governorate